The Romanians in Hungary constituted a small minority. According to the most recent Hungarian census of 2011 (based on self-determination), the population of Romanians was 35,641 or 0.3%, a significant increase from 8,482 or 0.1% of 2001. The community is concentrated in towns and villages close to the Romanian border, such as Battonya, Elek, Kétegyháza, Pusztaottlaka and Méhkerék, and in the city of Gyula. Romanians also live in the Hungarian capital, Budapest. As of 2011, Romanians constitute one of the largest foreign communities in the country.

History

Historically, a significant part of modern day Romania was part of the Kingdom of Hungary. The oldest extant documents from Transylvania make reference to Vlachs too. Regardless of the subject of Romanian presence/non-presence in Transylvania prior to the Hungarian conquest (See Origin of the Romanians), the first written sources about Romanian settlements derive from the 13th century, record was written about Olahteluk village in Bihar county from 1283. The 'land of Romanians', Terram Blacorum (1222,1280)  showed up in Fogaras and this area was mentioned under different name (Olachi) in 1285. The first appearance of a supposed Romanian name 'Ola' in Hungary derives from  a charter (1258). They were significant population in Transylvania, Banat, Máramaros (Maramureș) and Partium. 

In 1881, Romanian-majority settlements projected to the present-day territory of Hungary were: Bedő, Csengerújfalu, Kétegyháza, Körösszakál, Magyarcsanád, Méhkerék, Mezőpeterd, Pusztaottlaka and Vekerd. Important communities lived in Battonya, Elek, Körösszegapáti, Létavértes, Nyíradony, Pocsaj, Sarkadkeresztúr, and Zsáka. After the 1920 Treaty of Trianon, Hungary came close to ethnic homogeneity, with only 10.4% minorities, of which 6.9% were Germans, and Romanians constituted about 0.3%.

The numbers of Romanians in Hungary increased briefly with the onset of World War II when Hungary annexed parts of Czechoslovakia, Romania, and Yugoslavia. These annexations were affirmed under the Munich Agreement (1938), two Vienna Awards (1938 and 1940). In particular, the population of Northern Transylvania, according to the Hungarian census from 1941 counted 53.5% Hungarians and 39.1% Romanians.

In 1950, Foaia Românească ("The Romanian Sheet"; then known by another name) was founded in Gyula. It was the first newspaper of the Romanian minority in modern Hungary and currently is the one with longest and widest level of circulation within the country.

Notable people

See also

Hungarians in Romania
Diocese of Gyula
Hungary–Romania relations

References